Reckless is a 2018 Italian comedy film directed by Marco Ponti.

Plot summary

A 30-year-old mechanic on the verge of bankruptcy goes to the bank to ask for a loan, but in the blink of an eye, he finds himself the target of a robbery, with the police and the underworld on his tail and an unlikely hostage.

Cast

References

External links
 

2018 films
2010s Italian-language films
2018 comedy films
Italian comedy films
Films directed by Marco Ponti
Films produced by Fulvio Lucisano
2010s Italian films